A111 may refer to:

 Autobianchi A111, a car
 RFA Oakleaf (A111), a ship
 A111 road (England), a road in London connecting Palmers Green and Potters Bar
 A 111 motorway (Germany), a road connecting the Berliner Stadtring (A 100) and the Berliner Ring (A 10)
 A111 road (Malaysia), a road in Perak